Anuhea is Anuhea Jenkins' self-titled debut album. It was released on April 21, 2009.

Track listing
All songs written by Anuhea Jenkins.

"Charismatic SOB" – 10:58
"Right Love, Wrong Time" – 4:46
"Here I Go Again" – 3:26
"Ultimate Insult" – 3:28
"Big Deal" – 3:30
"No Words" – 3:36
"Endlessly" – 4:15
"Barista By Day" – 3:03
"Slow Down" – 3:34
"Fly" – 4:06
"I Just Want you Around" – 3:20
"Rumors" featuring DogBoy – 4:10

References

Anuhea Jenkins albums
2009 albums